Generation Nothing is the tenth studio album by American heavy metal band Metal Church. It is their first after their late 2012 reunion, and their fourth and last to feature vocalist Ronny Munroe.

Background
In 2009, Vanderhoof disbanded the band following the release of This Present Wasteland and their final performance at Rocklahoma that year. In 2012, it was announced that the band was reuniting for two shows on the 70000 Tons of Metal cruise. Ultimately, the band decided to stay together. 

On July 12, 2013 the album title was revealed.

Composition and recording
The band entered Kurdt Vanderhoof's English Channel studio in March 2013 to start work on the album. Vanderhoof started mixing the album in mid June 2013. Generation Nothing was released on October 22, 2013 on Vanderhoof's label, Body of Work Recordings.

Singer Ronny Munroe noted: "Generation Nothing is kind of a sad state out there for the youth now that they do not have the things that we used to have when I was growing up."

Reception

Generation Nothing received mixed reviews. Ken Morton of Highwire Daze praised the album, opining that it would both "impress the old school fans" and "gain this influential band a whole new set of converts ready to join the congregation." Ray Van Horn Jr. of Blabbermouth described the title track as "a headstrong beast of a cut," adding that much of the album "sticks to a straightforward power metal drive with heaps of resounding guitar intros and dense plods." He also judged the album "an agreeable career extension for Metal Church."

Track listing
All music by Kurdt Vanderhoof, lyrics by Vanderhoof except where indicated.

Personnel 
Metal Church
 Ronny Munroe – lead vocals
 Rick Van Zandt – lead guitar
 Kurdt Vanderhoof – rhythm guitar, producer, engineer, mixing, cover design
 Steve Unger – bass, backing vocals
 Jeff Plate – drums

Production
 Tim Harding – engineer
 Joao Duarte – art
 Kathy Moats – layout

References

2013 albums
Metal Church albums